Henry Fletcher may refer to:

Sir Henry Fletcher, 1st Baronet, of Hutton le Forest (died 1645)
Sir Henry Fletcher, 3rd Baronet, of Hutton le Forest (1661–1712), English MP for Cockermouth
Henry Fletcher (engraver) (fl. 1710–1750), English engraver
Sir Henry Fletcher, 1st Baronet, of Clea Hall (1727–1807), British MP for Cumberland
Sir Henry Aubrey-Fletcher, 4th Baronet (1835–1910), British MP for Horsham and Lewes
Sir Henry Aubrey-Fletcher, 6th Baronet (1887–1969), Lord Lieutenant of Buckinghamshire 1954–1961
Sir Henry Aubrey-Fletcher, 8th Baronet (born 1945), Lord Lieutenant of Buckinghamshire since 2006
Henry A. Fletcher (1839–1897), American Civil War veteran and Lieutenant Governor of Vermont
Henry Fletcher (mayor) (1859–1953), Mayor of Providence, Rhode Island 1909–1913
Henry P. Fletcher (1873–1959), U.S. diplomat and RNC chair
Henry Fletcher (cricketer) (1882–1937), English cricketer
Henry Fletcher (missionary) (1868–1933), New Zealand missionary and Presbyterian minister
Henry Fletcher, pen name of Fletcher Hanks

See also
Henry Fletcher House, historic house in Massachusetts, U.S.A.
Henry Fletcher Hance (1827–1886), British diplomat
Harry Fletcher (disambiguation)